Chaserider is the brand name for bus services operated around Cannock and Staffordshire by D&G Bus a local bus operator owned by Centrebus who are based in Adderley Green, Stoke-on-Trent, Staffordshire.

History
The Chaserider brand name, which refers to Cannock Chase, was first used by Midland Red from 1977 until 1992.

During November 2020, Centrebus Group subsidiary D&G Bus announced they would be taking over the Cannock depot of Arriva Midlands from the end of January 2021 with operations in Cannock and Stafford running under the revived Chaserider brand.

Services
Chaserider services operate mainly around Cannock and Stafford with some further afield into Wolverhampton.

Since taking over from Arriva Midlands in January 2021, Chaserider have undertaken a number of service reviews including a trial of running buses on Sundays in partnership with Designer Outlet West Midlands from the Pye Green estates, services to Baswich and Lichfield have also been revised or passed to other operators.

Some of the Stafford town centre network inherited from Arriva has been taken over by Select Bus Services.

From February 2023, Chaserider began operating subsidised services 102 and 103 along with school services 104 and 105 in the Telford area. Also operated under contract to Telford and Wrekin Council, Chaserider also began to operate service 100 in late 2022.

Service 1 which ran between Cannock and Walsall and operated every 20 minutes at its peak was curtailed to operate only between Cheslyn Hay and Cannock from the summer 2022. This was controversial as at the same time National Express cut its competing X51 between Cannock and Walsall (and which continues to Birmingham) to every 30 minutes from 20 minutes between the two towns.

Fleet
As part of the sale to D&G bus, Arriva included 46 vehicles with sale of Cannock depot, since the takeover most of the vehicles have been refurbished into D&G two tone red livery with Chaserider branding alongside some newer additions from within D&G parent company Centrebus Group

As of June 2022, Centrebus are upgrading the Chaserider fleet with newer vehicles from elsewhere within their operations.

References

External links
Company website
Flickr gallery

Bus operators in Cheshire
Bus operators in Staffordshire
Transport companies established in 1998
1998 establishments in England